Scandinavian Brewers' Review is a bimonthly English-language trade magazine focusing on beer and soft drinks production. It routinely features articles (mostly from trade members) on production, innovation, sustainability, finances, marketing and logistics.

Scandinavian Brewers' Review is published by the Danish Brewers' Guild every even month. Its headquarters is in Aarhus.

References

External links 
Official site

Bi-monthly magazines published in Denmark
Brewing
Magazines published in Denmark
Food and drink magazines
Magazines with year of establishment missing
Mass media in Aarhus
Monthly magazines published in Denmark
Professional and trade magazines
Soft drinks